Platensina katangana is a species of tephritid or fruit flies in the genus Platensina of the family Tephritidae.

Distribution
Congo, Uganda.

References

Tephritinae
Insects described in 1937
Diptera of Africa